Judith Baumel (born October 9, 1956 in Bronx, New York) is an American poet.

Life
She grew up in New York City, attending the Bronx High School of Science.  She graduated from Radcliffe College, magna cum laude, studying with Robert Lowell, Robert Fitzgerald, Elizabeth Bishop, Robert B. Shaw, James Richardson, and Jane Shore.  She graduated from Johns Hopkins University, where she studied with Richard Howard, Cynthia Macdonald, and David St. John.  She taught at Boston University, and Harvard University.

In 1985, she married the poet and journalist David Ghitelman, an early editor of AGNI magazine.  They divorced in 1999.  Her current partner is Philip Alcabes, professor of Public Health at Hunter College, City University of New York, and author of Dread: How Fear and Fantasy Have Fueled Epidemics from The Black Death to Avian Flu (Public Affairs 2009).

She was director of the Poetry Society of America from 1985 to 1988.

Her work has appeared in The Nation, The Paris Review, Ploughshares, Poetry, The Yale Review, AGNI, The New York Times, and The New Yorker.

She lives in New York City and teaches at Adelphi University, and City College of New York. Her blog is at http://www.judithbaumel.com

Awards
 1987 Walt Whitman Award

Work

Books

Periodicals

Memoir

Anthologies

References

External links
 Author's website

1956 births
Living people
Poets from New York (state)
Radcliffe College alumni
Harvard Advocate alumni
Johns Hopkins University alumni
Boston University faculty
Harvard University faculty
Adelphi University faculty
City College of New York faculty
American women poets
20th-century American poets
20th-century American women writers
21st-century American poets
21st-century American women writers
The Bronx High School of Science alumni
Writers from the Bronx
American women academics